Gamma Phoenicis is a star system in the constellation Phoenix, located around  distant.

γ Phoenicis is a spectroscopic binary and a small amplitude variable star.  The star system shows regular variations in brightness that were reported as a 97.5 day period in the Hipparcos catalogue, but have since been ascribed to a 194.1-day orbital period with primary and secondary minima.  Although the light curve appears to show eclipses, the high orbital inclination suggests the variations are due to ellipsoidal stars as they rotate in their orbit.  γ Phoenicis is listed in the General Catalogue of Variable Stars as a possible slow irregular variable with a range from 3.39 to 3.49, the same as reported for the eclipses or ellipsoidal variations.

Only the primary star in the γ Phoenicis system is visible. The second is inferred solely from variations in the radial velocity of the primary star. The primary is a red giant of spectral type M0III, a star that has used up its core hydrogen, then expanded and cooled as it burns a shell of hydrogen around an inert helium core. The primary is over five hundred times more luminous than the sun. The system shows signs of hot coronal activity, although the primary star is too cool for this. It may originate on the secondary, possibly as material is accreted from the cool giant primary.

Notes

References

Phoenix (constellation)
M-type giants
Beta Lyrae variables
Slow irregular variables
Phoenicis, Gamma
Durchmusterung objects
006867
0429
009053